The Marlborough Express is a newspaper serving the Marlborough area of New Zealand. Its headquarters are in Blenheim and has been published there since 1866.

Ownership
The Marlborough Express was set up by the printer, journalist and editor Samuel Johnson and his brother Thomas. They arrived in Blenheim in April 1866 and intended to set up weekly that served all of Marlborough Province, in opposition to the parochial papers serving Blenheim (Wairau Record) and Picton (Marlborough Press) already. Johnson sold the newspaper to Smith Furness and James Boudy in 1879. It remained in the Furness family until 1998, when it was acquired by Independent Newspapers Limited (INL). Fairfax New Zealand, now Stuff Ltd, bought the INL mastheads in 2003.

History
The Marlborough Express was published from 1866 as a weekly. It became a daily in 1880 and took over its rivals, the Marlborough Times in 1895, and the Marlborough Press in 1948.

The paper made headlines nationally in 2013 when it published a cartoon by Al Nisbet about the Government's introduction of food in schools that was widely criticised as "racist". The editor of the paper defended the cartoon's publication, saying it was meant to generate discussion. Race relations commissioner Susan Devoy called it "out of line".

The current editor is Ian Allen, who was appointed in 2018.

References

External links
 Marlborough Express (online edition)
Paperspast.natlib.govt.nz. Retrieved 2011-04-01

Marlborough Region
Publications with year of establishment missing
Stuff (company)
Newspapers published in New Zealand
Mass media in Blenheim, New Zealand
Newspapers established in 1866
1866 establishments in New Zealand